Slaviša Stojanović (born 27 January 1989) is a Serbian footballer who plays as a forward for Rad.

Career
Slavisa Stojanovic was born in Smederevo in the then former Republic of Yugoslavia and started his football at local club FK Smederevo, where he also made his professional debut. After playing for a number of Serbian and Israeli sides, Stojanovic signed for Kerala Blasters ahead of the 2018-19 campaign. In his debut Hero ISL season, he played 16 matches, returning four goals and two assists. He also made 3 appearances for Kerala Blasters 'B'. In 2020 he was signed by Serbian top division club OFK Bačka after the end of hi contract with the Blasters.

Career statistics

Kerala Blasters FC
Stojanović represented Kerala Blasters FC in the 2018–19 Indian Super League season. He played 16 league games and a game in the 2019 Super Cup. He finished his season with 4 goals and a assist to his name.

Kerala Blasters FC Reserves

Stojanović's below average performance at Blasters put him the reserve team of the club, the Kerala Blasters FC (B). He represented the B-team of the club in the Kerala Premier League,a regional state level league in the state of Kerala. He played in the 2018-19 season the league.

Honours
Jagodina
Serbian Cup: 2013

References

External links
 Slaviša Stojanović Stats at Utakmica.rs

1989 births
Sportspeople from Smederevo
Living people
Serbian footballers
Association football forwards
FK Smederevo players
FK Jagodina players
FK Borac Čačak players
FK Radnik Surdulica players
Hapoel Kfar Saba F.C. players
Hapoel Petah Tikva F.C. players
FK Radnički Niš players
Kerala Blasters FC players
Kerala Blasters FC Reserves and Academy players
OFK Bačka players
Navbahor Namangan players
FK Rad players
Serbian SuperLiga players
Serbian First League players
Israeli Premier League players
Liga Leumit players
Indian Super League players
Uzbekistan Super League players
Serbian expatriate footballers
Expatriate footballers in Israel
Serbian expatriate sportspeople in Israel
Expatriate footballers in India
Serbian expatriate sportspeople in India
Expatriate footballers in Uzbekistan
Serbian expatriate sportspeople in Uzbekistan